The Myth of the Negro Past is a 1941 monograph by Melville J. Herskovits intended to debunk the myth that African Americans lost their African culture due to their experience of slavery.  The book was the first publication of the Carnegie Corporation's Study of the American Negro and took 15 years to research. Herskovits argued that African Americans had retained their heritage from Africa in music, art, social structure, family life, religion, and speech patterns. The book became controversial because it was feared its arguments could be used by proponents of racial segregation to prove that African Americans could not be assimilated into mainstream American society.

References

Bibliography

Further reading

External links

1941 non-fiction books
American non-fiction books
Anthropology books
Harper & Brothers books
Race in the United States